Sidney Helliwell (30 January 1904 – 1939) was a professional footballer who played for Wycliffe, Sheffield Wednesday, Reading, Tottenham Hotspur, Walsall, Hednesford Town, Halifax Town.

Football career

After spells at Wycliffe F.C., Sheffield Wednesday and Reading the centre half joined Tottenham Hotspur. He made his debut for the club against Manchester United on 24 September 1927  and featured in nine matches for the Lilywhites in all competitions between 1927–28. Helliwell went on to play for Walsall where he played in 98 matches and scoring on eight occasions, Hednesford Town and finally Halifax Town.

References

1904 births
1939 deaths
Footballers from Sheffield
English footballers
English Football League players
Sheffield Wednesday F.C. players
Reading F.C. players
Tottenham Hotspur F.C. players
Walsall F.C. players
Hednesford Town F.C. players
Halifax Town A.F.C. players
Association football central defenders